Esenciales: Luna is one of three CD compilation albums by Latin American Mexican rock band Maná. This album is a collection of their greatest hits along with Eclipse and Sol. Maná's Esenciales: Luna includes an unreleased song, Te Llevaré Al Cielo, and a bonus track "Celoso" from the movie soundtrack album "My Family (Mi Familia)". Their music videos for the songs En el Muelle de San Blas and Vivir Sin Aire (live) are included in the CD.

Track listing

Singles

Certifications

References

Maná compilation albums
2003 compilation albums